714 may refer to:

 714, the year AD 714
 714 BC
 The number 714
 Area code 714 was the telephone area code for most of Southern California beyond Los Angeles County during the 1960s and 1970s. It would later be reduced in size until it essentially only covered portions of Orange County.
The record number of career home runs held by Babe Ruth until overtaken by Hank Aaron in 1974
 The colloquial name for the recreational drug Methaqualone (Quaalude), originating from the number 714 stamped on the tablets
 The number on the Dragnet (TV Show) badge.

 The song 714 by the Ohio-based band the Godz from their 1979 album “Nothing is Sacred”. The song itself refers to the colloquial term for Methaqualone and the high the user obtains when the drug is taken.